Bezborodko (Cyrillic: Безбородько or Безбородко) is a gender-neutral Ukrainian surname that may refer to the following notable people: 
Alexander Bezborodko (1747–1799), Grand Chancellor of Russian Empire 
Alexander Kushelev-Bezborodko (1800–1855), Russian nobleman and politician
Denys Bezborodko (born 1994), Ukrainian football forward 
Grigory Kushelev-Bezborodko (1832–1870), Russian writer, publisher and philanthropist, son of Nikolai
Nikolai Alexandrovich Kushelev-Bezborodko (1834–1862), Russian art collector, son of Nikolai

Ukrainian-language surnames